My Horrible Boss is a 2016 South Korean television series starring Lee Yo-won and Yoon Sang-hyun. It aired on JTBC's Fridays and Saturdays at 23:00 (KST) time slot from March 18 to May 7, 2016 for 16 episodes.

Synopsis
Marketing Department Manager, Nam Jung-gi (Yoon Sang-hyun) is so nice that his colleagues call him "Father Theresa" and "Walking UNICEF". There is nothing that can ruffle Jung-gi's feathers but his new coworker from their main competition, Ok Da-jeong (Lee Yo-won), who is so nasty she's been nicknamed "Ms. Temper", and isn't impressed with Jung-gi's affable nature. A figure from Ok Da-jeong's past makes it his mission to destroy the one thing that she cares about, and puts the company's livelihood on the line. Despite their differences, will they be able to unite to save their company?

Cast

Main
 Lee Yo-won as Ok Da-jeong
 Yoon Sang-hyun as Nam Jung-gi

Supporting

Nam Jung-gi's family
 Hwang Chansung as Nam Bong-gi
 Choi Hyun-joon as Nam Woo-joo
 Im Ha-ryong as Nam Yong-gab

Gold Chemicals
  as Kim Hwan-kyu
 Song Jae-hee as Ji Yoon-ho (Da-jung's 1st ex-husband)

Lovely Cosmetic
 Yoo Jae-myung as Jo Dong-kyu, President of Lovely Cosmetic
 Kim Sun-young as Han Young-mi, Nam's subordinate and a section head
 Kwon Hyun-sang as Park Hyun-woo, Nam's deputy
 Hwang Bo-ra as Jang Mi-ri, a temp assigned to Nam's department
 Ahn Sang-woo as Shin, Internal Affairs Department manager and brother-in-law of President Jo

Extended

 
 Ji Seong-geun
  as team leader Yang Joo-ho
 
 
 Han Jeong-gook
 Lee Min-seob
 Im Seung-tae
 Hong Ye-ri
 Seo Bo-ik
 Seok Il-woo
 Yoon Young-kyung
 Kwon Hyeok-soo

Special appearances

 Lee Jung-jin as Jang Si-hwan (Da-jung's 2nd ex-husband)
 Yeon Jung-hoon as Lee Ji-sang (Da-jung's 3rd ex-husband)
 MayBee as bank clerk
 Min Do-hee as Emily
  as Jung Bok-ja (Da-jung's mother)
 Yoon Jung-soo as apartment 802's citizen
 Kim Sook as apartment 802's citizen
 Hong Seok-cheon as photographer
 Cheetah as Lovely Cosmetic's cosmetics model (episode 13)
 Yoon Shi-yoon as new recruit Yoon Shi-yoon (episode 16)

Ratings
In this table,  represent the lowest ratings and  represent the highest ratings.

International broadcast
  - TV2 (Malaysia): starting June 12, 2018 (every Monday and Tuesday at 8:30 pm – 9:30 pm).

References

External links
  
 My Horrible Boss at Drama House 
 My Horrible Boss at Samhwa Networks 
 
 
 

Korean-language television shows
2016 South Korean television series debuts
2016 South Korean television series endings
JTBC television dramas
South Korean romantic comedy television series
Television series by Samhwa Networks
Television series by Drama House